Events in the year 2023 in Kiribati.

Incumbents 

 President: Taneti Maamau
 Vice President: Teuea Toatu

Events 

Ongoing — COVID-19 pandemic in Kiribati

 30 January – Prime Minister of Fiji Sitiveni Rabuka confirms that Kiribati will rejoin the Pacific Islands Forum after leaving it last year over a dispute. Rabuka met Kiribati president Taneti Mamau to discuss the issue.

See also 

 History of Kiribati

References 

 
2020s in Kiribati
Years of the 21st century in Kiribati
Kiribati
Kiribati